Attawapiskat Lake is a lake in Kenora District, Ontario, Canada. The primary inflows are the Otoskwin River, the Marten-Drinking River and the Pineimuta River. The two outflows are the Attawapiskat River and the North Channel, which itself flows into the Attawapiskat River.

The First Nations community of Neskantaga (also known as Lansdowne House, Ontario) is located on the west side of the lake.

The formations are unique to the region, the Swampy Cree (Omushkegowuk) word for which, tawâpiskâ (as "kâh-tawâpiskâk" in its Conjunct form and as "êh-tawâpiskât" in its Participle form), gives name to the river and hence the lake.

See also
List of lakes of Ontario

References

Lakes of Kenora District
Hudson's Bay Company trading posts